Rancho Las Salinas also called El Tucho was a four-square-league Spanish land concession in the Salinas Valley, in present day Monterey County, California. 

It was given in 1795 to Antonio Aceves and Antonio Romero.  A  Mexican land grant was made to Gabriel Espinosa by Mexican governor Nicolás Gutiérrez in 1839. The grant extended along the Salinas River from present day Marina to Salinas.

History
Antonio Quiterio Aceves and Antonio Romero received a four-square-league concession on the Salinas River in 1795, the first such land concession in the Monterey Bay area.  However, the grant was abandoned. 

Subsequently, a one square league Mexican grant was made to Gabriel Espinosa in 1839. Today's Espinosa Road and Espinosa Lake were named for the Espinosa family.

With the cession of California to the United States following the Mexican-American War, the 1848 Treaty of Guadalupe Hidalgo provided that the land grants would be honored.  As required by the Land Act of 1851, a claim for Rancho Las Salinas was filed with the Public Land Commission in 1853, and the grant was patented to Lucinda E. Pogue and the heirs of Gabriel Espinosa in 1867.  Pogue received an undivided two-sevenths of the grant and each of the five children of Espinosa received one-seventh.

See also
Ranchos of Monterey County, California
List of Ranchos of California

References

 

Las Salinas
1795 in Alta California
Salinas, California
1795 establishments in Alta California
1839 establishments in Alta California
Las Salinas